The  was a botanical garden located in Kashima, Fukushima, Japan. It was open daily without charge. The garden had contained about 150 plant varieties that appeared in the Man'yōshū anthology.

References

See also 
 List of botanical gardens in Japan

Botanical gardens in Japan
Gardens in Fukushima Prefecture